The ambassador of France to Peru is the official representative of France in Peru.

Both countries established relations in 1826 and have maintained them since. Relations were severed once during World War II with the French State of Philippe Pétain, with Peru instead establishing relations with Free France and normalizing its relations with said government after the war, elevating the relations to embassy level. In 1973, Peru again severed diplomatic relations with France in protest of French nuclear testing in the South Pacific Ocean. The rupture lasted until 1975.

List of representatives

See also
France–Peru relations
List of ambassadors of Peru to France

References

 
France
Peru